Lovčić is a village in municipality of Brodski Stupnik in the central part of Brod-Posavina County.

Demographics

References

Populated places in Brod-Posavina County